Martineau River is a river in the Canadian provinces of Saskatchewan and Alberta. Its source is at Primrose Lake in north-western Saskatchewan and its mouth is at Cold Lake in Alberta. The river travels in a south-westerly direction through muskeg and the boreal forest ecozone of Canada The majority of the river and its tributaries are in Saskatchewan with only the final leg being in Alberta.

Martineau River is joined by several smaller creeks and rivers en route to Cold Lake, including the Muskeg River, Kesatasew River, Middle Creek, and Ustookumin Creek. Several lakes, including Muskeg, Wotherspoon, Matisekawe, Kesatasew, Ethelwyn, and Lost Lakes are within the river's drainage basin. Part of the western portion of the Mostoos Hills, which are east of Primrose Lake and north of Meadow Lake Provincial Park, are also within Martineau's drainage basin.

Martineau River is the first one in a series of rivers that connect from Primrose Lake to Lac Île-à-la-Crosse and the Churchill River, which is a major river in the Hudson Bay drainage basin. The other rivers in the series include Cold River, which drains Cold Lake and flows east and empties into Lac des Îles. Lac des Îles is the source of the Waterhen River, which is a tributary of the Beaver River. Beaver River flows north and into Lac Île-à-la-Crosse and the Churchill River.

Fish
The most common fish in the river include lake trout, walleye, and northern pike.

See also
List of rivers of Saskatchewan
List of rivers of Alberta
Hudson Bay drainage basin

References

Rivers of Saskatchewan
Rivers of Alberta
Tributaries of Hudson Bay
Borders of Alberta
Borders of Saskatchewan
Division No. 18, Saskatchewan
Municipal District of Bonnyville No. 87